Elena Leonardi (born 7 December 1995) is an Italian professional racing cyclist, who most recently rode for UCI Women's Continental Team .

See also
 List of 2015 UCI Women's Teams and riders

References

External links
 

1995 births
Living people
Italian female cyclists
People from Cles
Sportspeople from Trentino
Cyclists from Trentino-Alto Adige/Südtirol